Mousesack (Polish: Myszowór), a character in The Witcher books by Andrzej Sapkowski
 phascogale, a genus of Australian marsupials